Guerric or Guerricus is a masculine given name that may refer to:

Guerric of Igny (d. 1157), Cistercian abbot
Guerric of Petra (fl. 1167–83), archbishop
Guerric of Faversham (fl. 1180), abbot
Guerric of Saint-Quentin (fl. 1241), Dominican theologian